The Panhard ERC (Engin à Roues, Canon; "Engine with wheels, cannon") is a French six-wheeled armoured car which is highly mobile and amphibious with an option of being NBC-proof. While various models were tested, only two versions of the ERC entered production in large numbers: the ERC-90 Lynx and the ERC-90 Sagaie. The main difference between the two versions is the type of turret and 90 mm gun fitted. Sagaie is French for assegai, a type of African spear.

It will gradually be replaced in French service by the EBRC Jaguar from 2021 and onwards.

Background
The ERC was originally a private venture aimed at the export market. It was developed by Panhard in the latter half of the 1970s as a heavier, six-wheeled successor to Panhard's highly successful AML range of armoured vehicles.

Design
The ERC and VCR are a family of six wheel armoured reconnaissance vehicles, the ERC being the cannon-armed turret model and the VCR being the armoured personnel carrier version.  ERC is the French abbreviation of term Engin à Roues, Canon or Gun-armed Wheeled Vehicle. The ERC shares many components of the VCR vehicles.  Two main versions of the ERC were developed: first  the ERC F1 90 Lynx,  then the ERC F4 90 Sagaie.  The Lynx appeared about 1977 and the Sagaie followed approximately two years later in 1979.  The Lynx was developed primarily as an armoured reconnaissance vehicle.  The Sagaie was also an armoured reconnaissance vehicle, with the added secondary role of tank-destroyer. In 1977, Panhard offered the ERC and VCR to the French Army as an armoured personnel carrier (APC) and gun-armed reconnaissance vehicle. The Army instead chose the VAB four-wheeled armoured vehicle from Saviem for the larger APC contract, and the AMX 10 RC from GIAT for the reconnaissance requirement. Panhard also offered the vehicles to France's Mobile Gendarmerie (a much smaller order), but the Gendarmerie chose the Saviem VBC-90. Panhard later found success for both the VRC and ERC in the world export market, and later with the ERC version with the French Army entering service in 1984.

Production history

The first production order for the ERC 90 F1 Lynx was in October 1979 from Argentina, for 36 units, to be used by Argentine Marines to patrol the long border between Argentina and Chile.  The second large order was from Mexico, for 42 units in early 1981. Both countries ordered the ERC Lynx version because it could elevate or depress its 90mm cannon over a wider range for operations in steep mountain terrain.

Further export orders followed. Both nations also appreciated the all-terrain mobility of the Lynx which is enhanced by the capability to raise or lower the central pair of wheels depending on terrain condition, especially in sandy or muddy ground. All versions of the ERC are also equipped with two hydrojets behind the rear wheels and require no preparation for amphibious operations.

ERC 90 F4 Sagaie

Shortly after the ERC 90 F1 Lynx had been built for export, Panhard recognized the need for a cost-effective light armoured vehicle that could defeat a more modern main battle tank (MBT), like the Russian T-72 which was being exported to many nations. The Lynx version could only fire medium-velocity HEAT rounds in the anti-tank role, which lacked the penetration to defeat the more modern MBTs. Panhard designed a turret which mounted the long barrel F4 90mm smooth bore-cannon developed by GIAT, and designated the vehicle the ERC 90 F4 Sagaie.  The F4 90mm could fire APFSDS (Armour Piercing Fin Stabilised Discarding Sabot) rounds at a much higher velocity than the Lynx's F1 90mm; GIAT and Panhard both claimed it could penetrate heavy armour at 2000 metres. For a while, GIAT engineers could not find a suitable muzzle brake for the Sagaie which would not interfere with the firing of APFSDS rounds, but finally found a suitable solution using a muzzle brake design from the older AMX-13 tank.

Ivory Coast was the first export customer, ordering five Sagaies to replace its aging AMX-13s in the light armour role. At this time period, the French Army was organising the Fast Deployment Force (FDF) for overseas military missions, mainly in Africa or the Middle East.  The main core of the FDF would be French Army's 9th Marine Infantry Division and 11th Parachute Division.  To make the new FDF "more muscular" a new unit was activated, the 31st Heavy Half Brigade (31 DBL) of two regiments.  One regiment was to be armed with vehicles mounting the HOT wire-guided missile, and the other with cannon-armed vehicles that could provide both reconnaissance and a limited tank-killing role.

The French Army had at first planned on equipping the second regiment with the AMX-10RC, but were told that this vehicle was not suitable for transport by the French Air Force Transall C-160 or its allies' Hercules C-130 aircraft due to size and weight issues. In addition, most of the bridges in Africa had only a 6 to 8 ton load capacity. So instead of the larger AMX-10RC, which was already in service with the French Army, the French Army Staff took the surprise step in December 1980 of ordering the Sagaie for the future FDF. And to date the Sagaie has proved very useful for the French Army in its African bases and even in urban conditions during the Siege of Sarajevo. The last known combat uses of the Sagaie were with French troops stationed in Ivory Coast on a peace-keeping mission between two rival factions and in Mali in 2013.

Sagaie upgrade 
The French Army has upgraded 160 of its 192 ERC's in service with a diesel MTU 4-cylinder 170 hp engine coupled to an automatic gearbox made by Renk and have made enhancements to the turret to improve observation, fire control and command.

ERC-90 Sagaie 2 (twin-engine)
A weakness of the Sagaie is its low power-to-weight ratio. The Sagaie 2 is an ERC extended with two Peugeot XD 3T four-cylinder turbocharged diesel 98 hp engines; the same engine used on the VBL (Light Armoured Vehicle). Six were ordered by Gabon. A prototype equipped with two PRV V6 engines was built as a private venture, but none were ordered.

Variants

EMC 81: Fire support version armed with 81mm mortar in an Hispano-Suiza EMC turret.
ERC 20 Kriss: Anti-aircraft version with  2× 20 mm autocannons.
ERC 60-20: Fitted with Hispano-Suiza 60-20 Serval turret armed with a 60 mm mortar and a 20 mm autocannon.
ERC 90 (Diesel): Fitted with a diesel engine.
ERC 90 F1 Lynx: Fitted with the Hispano-Suiza Lynx 90 turret as fitted to the Panhard AML.
ERC 90 F4 Sagaie: Fitted with GIAT TS 90 turret with long barrel high velocity cannon that can fire APFSDS anti-tank rounds.
ERC 90 Sagaie 2: Slightly larger version fitted with twin engines and improved turret.
VCR: APC based on ERC.

Operators

: 12 ERC-90 Lynx
: 4 ERC-90 Lynx. 9 more offered by France in January 2021.
: 190 ERC-90 Sagaie
: 6 ERC-90 Sagaie, 4 ERC-20 Kriss
: 7 ERC-90 Sagaie
: 120 ERC-90 Lynx
: 40 ERC-90 Sagaie, 40 ERC-90 Lynx

References
Notes

External links

globalsecurity.org
cnn.com
nasog.net
ERC 90 Sagaie on Armour.ws
armyrecognition.com
Video links

Sagaie in action in CHAD on Youtube by Panhard 2008.

Armoured cars of France
Fire support vehicles
Wheeled reconnaissance vehicles
Panhard military vehicles
Six-wheeled vehicles
Reconnaissance vehicles of the Cold War
Military vehicles introduced in the 1980s